Tsogt taij, released in the Soviet Union as Knights of the Steppes, is a 1945 film by Russian director Yuri Tarich. Written by Tarich and respected Mongolian linguist Byambyn Rinchen, the film tells the story of Choghtu Khong Tayiji.

Literature 
 Petr Rollberg. Historical Dictionary of Russian and Soviet Cinema. United Kingdom 2008, 2nd edition. Page: 728.
 BARNETT, ROBERT. “‘Tsogt Taij’ and the Disappearance of the Overlord: Triangular Relations in Three Inner Asian Films.” Inner Asia, vol. 9, no. 1, 2007, pp. 41–75, http://www.jstor.org/stable/23615067. Accessed 15 May 2022.
 Manduhai Buyandelger. Tricky Representations: Buddhism in the Cinema during Socialism in Mongolia. In: Silk Road. Summer 2008, Vol. 6.1; Pages: 54–62. 

Mongolian drama films